Balkany is a surname. Notable people with the surname include:

Julien Balkany (born 1981), French businessman and investor
Milton Balkany (born 1946), American Orthodox rabbi
Patrick Balkany (born 1948), French politician
Thomas J. Balkany, American ear surgeon, otolaryngologist, and neurotologist